Wiggo may refer to:

People with the given name
 Wiggo Hanssen, Norwegian speed skater

Other
 Bradley Wiggins, British cyclist

See also
 Viggo (given name)
 Wigo (disambiguation)